Lawrence Dikarri Thomas (born April 16, 1993) is a former American football fullback. He played college football at Michigan State and signed with the Jets as an undrafted free agent in 2016.

Early years
Thomas was selected and participated in the 2011 Under Armour All-America Game in St. Petersburg, Florida. Thomas was named high school finalist for the 2010 Butkus Award. Thomas was ranked 3rd among the country's top defensive ends by 247Sports.com and was ranked 7th defensive end prospect by Scout.com.

Professional career

New York Jets
On April 30, 2016, Thomas signed with the New York Jets as an undrafted free agent following the conclusion of the 2016 NFL Draft. He was placed on injured reserve with a shoulder injury on September 29, 2016. He finished his rookie season with four tackles in three games played.

On September 2, 2017, Thomas was waived by the Jets and was later re-signed to the practice squad. He was promoted to the active roster on September 16, 2017. Upon being added to the active roster, Thomas changed his jersey number to 44 to be eligible to play fullback.

On September 8, 2018, Thomas was waived by the Jets.

References

External links
Michigan State Spartans bio
New York Jets bio

Living people
1993 births
Players of American football from Detroit
American football defensive ends
Michigan State Spartans football players
New York Jets players
Renaissance High School alumni
Ed Block Courage Award recipients